Trevor Christensen (born 12 May 1993), known professionally as Said the Sky, is an American electronic dance music producer, DJ and musician.

Early life 
At the age of 8, Christensen went for piano lessons which he had disliked. He quit the lessons after several years but later rejoined it while he was in middle school, along picking up other instruments to learn. He first got into electronic dance music by learning about the production at a Digital Audio Production class in high school.

Christensen uses Ableton Live to produce music. Previously, he used Logic Pro. He attended Berklee College Of Music where he took a lot of beginner/intermediate courses such as music theory, ear training and lessons, prior to launching the 'Said the Sky' project, despite failing to participate in their production program.

History

2014: Debut extended play 
Christensen was signed by Phase Management, who he was introduced to at a music festival in the summer of 2014. He knew and was inspired by some of the artists under Phase Management, which motivated him to sign for them.

On June 8, 2014, he self-released his debut EP Faith. Tyler Trew of YourEDM reviewed the EP stating, "He plays into both of his strengths, utilizing piano heavily throughout his productions in conjunction with superior sound design, most notably in the neuro basses that can be found in all of his singles on Faith. You get the most bass with "Everything" which starts off the EP quite perfectly and ever so celestially; piano and an inspiring vocal speech lead you into what is to come. That being some of the most beautifully epic music you are going to hear."

2015: Singles 
On July 9, 2015, Christensen released four singles including two collaborations with Illenium onto iTunes. The singles are "Falling In", "In Your Wake", "Run Away" and "Book of Us". Speaking about his collaboration and tours with Illenium, Christensen said touring with him was a 'dream come true' and he had never thought of doing so at that time in his life.

On July 17, 2015, he released "Espy" as a single and four days later, he released an EP titled Painted White with Illenium and Cristina Soto.

On July 30, 2015, he released three singles "Disciple", "For You" and "Everything" where the first two features Melissa Hayes. He released four more singles later in the year, titled "Darling", "Nostalgia", "Listen" and "Mountains". Missio features on "Darling" and "Nostalgia" whereas Diamond Eyes features on "Mountains". "Disciple", "Everything" and "Listen" are singles from his EP Faith.

2016: Collaborations 
On January 22, 2016, he released his first single of the year "Ares". In August 2016, it was revealed that Christensen collaborated with Illenium and Seven Lions for a song that was debuted at Das Energi Festival 2016. Christensen has supported Illenium on his headline tour across the United States.

On 30 April 2016, Christensen performed at Denver's Gothic Theatre, he also toured with Illenium, who also performed at Denver.

On 10 October 2016, he released a single with DJs Illenium and Seven Lions titled "Rush Over Me" featuring the vocals of Haliene. The song was first premiered by Illenium during a live show at Das Energi in Salt Lake City, Utah, in August.

On 14 October 2016, he collaborated with fellow DJ 3LAU to release the single "Fire" featuring NÉONHÈART. Speaking in an interview, 3LAU said that Christensen sent him a "fantastic piano riff, and (they) built the song out of that". All revenue generated from Christensen's and 3LAU's collaborative single "Fire" will be donated to PoP, a non-profit organization that "builds schools and expands educational opportunities in the developing world." The song's genre is future bass. The song was released via 3LAU's non-profit record label, Blume. An official music video was uploaded by popular music channel, Proximity, on 14 November 2016 which has garnered over 200,000 views.

On 16 November 2016, Christensen released a remix of The Chainsmokers' second song off their EP "Collage", titled "All We Know".

In 2017 he co-produced "Where'd U Go" with Illenium (available on Illenium's album "Awake").

In 2018, he released his first studio album Wide-Eyed, which has featured collaborations with Jack Newsome, Vancouver Sleep Clinic, Matthew Koma, and Dabin.

On December 13, 2021 he announced the title of his second studio album Sentiment, and an upcoming tour in 2022 including collaborations with Dabin and Matthew Koma.

Discography

Studio albums

Extended plays

Singles

As lead artist

Guest appearances

Remixes

2014 
 Secoya – "Run" (Illenium and Said the Sky Remix)
 Gemini – "A Fire Inside" (Said the Sky Remix)
 Novo Amor & Ed Tullett – "Faux" (Said the Sky Remix)
 Snow Dayy – "The Tunnel" (Said the Sky Remix)

2015 
 Enkidu – "Falling" (Illenium & Said the Sky Remix)

2016 
 Seven Lions featuring LIGHTS – "Falling Away" (Said the Sky Remix)
 Ellie Goulding – "Something in the Way You Move" (Said the Sky Remix)
 ATB – "Flash X" (Said the Sky Remix)
 Owl City – "Fireflies" (Said the Sky Remix)
 The Chainsmokers - "All We Know" (Said the Sky Remix)

2017 
 Galantis - "Rich Boy" (Said The Sky Remix)

2018 
 Selena Gomez and Marshmello - "Wolves" (Said The Sky Remix)
 RL Grime - "Atoms" (Said The Sky Remix)

2021 
 Kane Brown and Blackbear - "Memory" (Said The Sky Remix)

References 

1993 births
Living people
American dance musicians
Dubstep musicians
American DJs
Record producers from Colorado
Future bass musicians
Electronic dance music DJs